Dickinson House is located in Alloway Township, Salem County, New Jersey, United States. The house was built in 1754 and was added to the National Register of Historic Places on February 20, 1975.

Further reading

See also
National Register of Historic Places listings in Salem County, New Jersey
List of the oldest buildings in New Jersey

References

Houses on the National Register of Historic Places in New Jersey
Houses completed in 1754
Houses in Salem County, New Jersey
National Register of Historic Places in Salem County, New Jersey
 
1754 establishments in New Jersey
New Jersey Register of Historic Places